The Second Mrs Tanqueray is a 1916 British silent film directed by Fred Paul and starring George Alexander, Hilda Moore and Norman Forbes. It is an adaptation of the 1893 play The Second Mrs Tanqueray by Arthur Wing Pinero.

Cast
 George Alexander - Aubrey Tanqueray
 Hilda Moore - Paula
 Norman Forbes - Caley Drummle
 Marie Hemingway - Ellean Tanqueray
 James Lindsay - Sir George Orreyd
 May Leslie Stuart - Lady Orreyd
 Nelson Ramsey - Misquith
 Mary Rorke - Mrs. Cortellion
 Minna Grey - Mrs. Tanqueray
 Roland Pertwee - Capotain Hugh Ardale
 Bernard Vaughan - Gordon Jayne

References

External links

1916 films
British silent feature films
1916 drama films
Ideal Film Company films
Films directed by Fred Paul
British films based on plays
British drama films
British black-and-white films
1910s English-language films
1910s British films
Silent drama films